Graduate Seattle is an Art Deco hotel tower in Seattle's University District. The building previously housed Hotel Deca.

References

External links
 

Art Deco architecture in Washington (state)
Hotels in Seattle
University District, Seattle
2018 establishments in Washington (state)